The Chesapeake Fire Department provides fire protection and emergency medical services to the Independent city of Chesapeake, Virginia.

History 
The Chesapeake Fire Department got its start in 1892 when a group of citizens in what was at that time South Norfolk, Virginia, raised concerns about the lack of fire protection in the community. The group met and organized a local fire department. When the City of South Norfolk and Norfolk County merged on January 1, 1963, the independent city of Chesapeake was born. Along with this merger, multiple independent fire departments were merged to form the new City of Chesapeake Fire Department.

Stations and apparatus 

*Staffed during peak hours and for special events only

References

Fire
Fire departments in Virginia